The 37th César Awards ceremony, presented by the French Academy of Cinema Arts and Techniques (Académie des Arts et Techniques du Cinéma), was held on 24 February 2012, at the Théâtre du Châtelet in Paris. The awards honoured the best films of 2011. The Artist won six out of its ten nominations, including Best Film,  Best Director (Michel Hazanavicius), Best Actress (Bérénice Bejo), and Best Cinematography (Guillaume Schiffman). The ceremony was chaired by Guillaume Canet, with Antoine de Caunes as master of ceremonies. Nominations were announced 27 January 2012.

Winners and nominees 

Winners are listed first and highlighted in bold.

Honorary César 
Kate Winslet, English actress and singer

Viewers
The show was followed by 3.9 million viewers. This corresponds to 18.2% of the audience.

See also
 84th Academy Awards
 65th British Academy Film Awards
 24th European Film Awards
 17th Lumières Awards
 2nd Magritte Awards

References

External links
 Official website
 
 37th César Awards at AlloCiné

2012
2012 in French cinema
2012 film awards